The International Day Against Police Brutality occurs on March 15.  It first began in 1997 as an initiative of the Montreal-based Collective Opposed to Police Brutality and the Black Flag group in Switzerland. A march is held yearly in Montreal.

Acceptance of March 15 as a focal day of solidarity against police brutality varies from one place to another.  In the United States, the October 22 Coalition to Stop Police Brutality, Repression, and the Criminalization of a Generation, a group mounted by the RCP has succeeded in building support for October 22 (also known as O22) as National Anti Police Brutality Day since 1995.

See also
 Copwatch
 Legal observer
 Black Lives Matter

References

External links
 Police Brutality World Wide archive
 Black Flag, Switzerland
 Collective Opposed to Police Brutality, Montreal, Canada
 October 22 Coalition to Stop Police Brutality, Repression, and the Criminalization of a Generation
 Officer injured in Montreal anti-police brutality protest
 Photos: Police and protesters clash in Montreal
 Montreal police, anti-police protesters clash in annual standoff
 Montreal police gird for annual protest Friday against police brutality 

March observances
Police brutality